Termini Airfield is an abandoned World War II military airfield on Sicily, located approximately 4 km west-northwest of Termini Imerese.

It was an all-weather temporary field built by the XII Engineer Command using a graded earth compacted surface, with a prefabricated hessian (burlap) surfacing known as PHS. PHS was made of an asphalt-impregnated jute which was rolled out over the compacted surface over a square mesh track (SMT) grid of wire joined in 3-inch squares.   Pierced Steel Planking was also used for parking areas, as well as for dispersal sites, when it was available.   In addition, tents were used for billeting and also for support facilities; an access road was built to the existing road infrastructure; a dump for supplies, ammunition, and gasoline drums, along with a drinkable water and minimal electrical grid for communications and station lighting.

Once completed it was turned over for use by the Twelfth Air Force 31st Fighter Group from 2  August to 2 September 1943, during the liberation of Sicily, before moving up to Milazzo in eastern Sicily to take part in the Invasion of Italy.

This airfield was used by the Italian S 79 aircraft carrying the diplomatic Mission designed to firm the Unconditional Surrender/Armistizio at Cassibile on September 3 1943

With the Americans pulling out, engineers dismantled the airfield. Today, there appears to be traces of the airfield in a flat, open area to the southwest of Termini Imerese.

References

 Maurer, Maurer. Air Force Combat Units of World War II. Maxwell AFB, Alabama: Office of Air Force History, 1983. .

External links

Airfields of the United States Army Air Forces in Italy
Airports established in 1943